Şefik Birkiye (born 1954) is a Turkish-Belgian architect who has designed buildings in Brussels, France, Switzerland, Monaco, the United States, and Turkey. He is the founder of Vizzion Architects, a team which has been designing architecture in Brussels since 1979, as well as the founder of Vizzion Europe, an international umbrella company.

Early life and education
Birkiye was born in Ankara in 1954. At the age of 17, he moved to Brussels in order to pursue his academic interests. In 1978, he graduated in architecture from La Cambre School of Architecture. In 1981, he then went to study at University of Louvain where he obtained a master's degree in urban planning.

Career

In 1979, Birkiye founded Vizzion Architects, a team with several high-profile projects in Brussels. After many years of success and growing reputation in the industry, Birkiye founded the umbrella company Vizzion Europe in order to expand internationally. To date, Vizzion Europe has designed over 8 million metres sq. of property, 4 million of which is situated in Brussels.

Projects
Jardin des Fonderies apartment (1998) - received the 1998 MIPIM Award for best residential development
City 2 shopping mall (1999)
Green Island office complex (2000) - received the 2000 MIPIM Award for best business centre
Presidential Complex (Turkey) - Turkish Presidential Complex (2014)
Taksim Mosque - Istanbul, Turkey (2021)

References

External links

 Vizzion Architects
 Vizzion Europe

Living people
1954 births
Turkish architects
Belgian people of Turkish descent
Belgian architects
People from Ankara
Université catholique de Louvain alumni